Me Yun San (1713–31 July 1771) is the empress consort of King Alaungpaya of Burma (Myanmar), and the royal mother who gave birth to three kings of Konbaung Dynasty: Naungdawgyi, Hsinbyushin and Bodawpaya. She served as the regent while Alaungpaya went to war.

Alaungpaya had officially pronounced that all sons of Yun San would become kings in order of seniority. She is famous for her peace keeping efforts between her two eldest sons, Naungdawgyi and Hsinbyushin, regarding the succession to throne after Alaungpaya's death in 1760. She died during Hsinbyushin's reign in 1771.

References

Bibliography
 

Chief queens consort of Konbaung dynasty
1713 births
1771 deaths
Burmese Buddhists
18th-century Burmese women